The Fiat CM6614 is a 4x4 wheeled armoured personnel carrier developed as a joint venture between Fiat and Oto Melara of Italy.  The hull is welded steel, and the vehicle is amphibious. The first prototype was built in 1972.

Description 
The CM6614 hull is made of welded steel with a uniform thickness of 8 mm; the driver's seat is on the front of the vehicle on the left and is equipped with episcopes that allow observation of the vehicle in front and to the sides. The engine with the transmission is located in the front right side of the vehicle in order to leave as much space as possible to the team of soldiers transported in the rear, equipped with a hatch for the rapid disembarkation / embarkation of men. The Blindo could be armed with a simple turret (which can be folded down to facilitate strategic transport) manually operated (the same as the VCC-1 Camillino) equipped with a 12.7 mm heavy machine gun. There is also has a hatch in the middle of the vehicle and there are side slits and rear equipped with fume extractor from the fighting compartment, that allow the safe use of personal armament by the transported personnel. On each side of the turret there is finally an installation for three electrically operated fog-type grenade launchers.

The vehicle is equipped with run-flat tires, in which the internal material is made of piano strings. The vehicle also has an amphibious feature. The thrust in the water is provided by the movement created by the wheels, while buoyancy is achieved thanks to the shape of the vehicle. However, the vehicle is not fully waterproof; the sensor detects the water level, and automatically activates pumps to extract water from the vehicle. The Fiat CM6614 can be very useful in rescue missions and emergencies such as natural disasters, and for this reason it is still in service in the mobile police of the State Police.

However, Italian-produced CM6614 in 1976 to 1977 showed major flaws in its armor steel during trials in South Korea. When a projectile impacts armor, the entire armor plate cracks like glass rather than creating a single hole. In addition, brand new vehicles also suffered cracks on the armor plate at high temperatures, cutting the vehicle into pieces without any human interference.

Exports

South Korea 
In the 1970s, South Korea came in need of wheeled armored vehicles to protect major cities and airfields against North Korean special forces by providing quick placement of defending troops. In 1976, South Korea received a sample of Thyssen Henschel UR-416 from West Germany and a CM6614 from Italy. Korea originally selected UR-416 for license production; however, due to political tension between South Korea and the United States, the U.S. blocked NATO members from selling such armored vehicles to South Korea. After hearing a refusal from West Germany, South Korea turned its eye to Italian company Fiat, which was very eager to sell the CM6614, and signed a contract behind the curtain for a license under the designation KM900.

To avoid the restriction from NATO, Italy and South Korea smuggled CM6614 by shipping by parts to third countries, then rerouted to Busan for transferring to Asia Motors (now Kia) for assembly. During the trial, South Korea found major flaws in Italian armor steel, thus requested transfer of armor steel and run-flat tire technology in order to fix the problem and strengthen logistics by producing locally. The transferred technologies were sent to Korean steel & tire manufacturing companies and research groups, and became the basis for future Korean-made armor steel that is used in current MBTs, SPHs, IFVs, and even by the navy's destroyers.

KM900/KM901s were put in service since 1977, and were mainly used by the Republic of Korea Army Capital Defense Command, and airfield securities of the Republic of Korea Air Force. The ROKAF began replacing KM900/KM901 with K200A1 APCs since 1997. The ROKA also retired all vehicles from active service in 2016, and will replace the inventory with newly developed K806/K808 APCs.

Variants

CM6616
The CM6616 was a version of the CM6614 that incorporated a turret armed with a 20mm autocannon.  The turret was designed, built, and installed by OTO Melara.

KM900/KM901 
The KM900 was license produced version of the CM6614 by Asia Motors for use by the Republic of Korea Army and the Republic of Korea Air Force. The KM901 is a KM900 with a dozer blade on the front.

Operators

Current operators

CM6614

  
 Polizia di Stato

 - 25
State Police - 50
 - 200

Peruvian Army - 20

Somaliland National Army - 5+
 - 150
 - 24

CM6616
 - 100

Peruvian Army - 80

Somaliland National Army - 3+

Former operators

CM6614
 
Italian Air Force - 110
Italian Army - 14
 - 400 
Republic of Korea Army
Republic of Korea Air Force
 - 260

CM6616
 (all out of service)
Carabinieri - 52
 - 30
Note: Numbers reflect total orders/production for each country.  Current holdings may be different.

References

External links
 KM900 on Military-Today
 Fiat 6614 on Military-Today

Armoured personnel carriers of Italy
Wheeled armoured fighting vehicles
Wheeled armoured personnel carriers
Amphibious armoured personnel carriers
Armoured personnel carriers of South Korea
Military vehicles introduced in the 1970s